Thomas Frühmann (born 23 January 1953) is an Austrian equestrian and Olympic medalist. He was born in Vienna. He won a silver medal in show jumping at the 1992 Summer Olympics in Barcelona.

References

External links

1953 births
Living people
Austrian male equestrians
Olympic equestrians of Austria
Olympic silver medalists for Austria
Equestrians at the 1976 Summer Olympics
Equestrians at the 1992 Summer Olympics
Sportspeople from Vienna
Olympic medalists in equestrian
Medalists at the 1992 Summer Olympics